Charles Atshimene (born 5 February 2001) is a Nigerian footballer who plays as a forward for Albanian club Bylis.

Career statistics

Club

Notes

International

References

2001 births
People from Kebbi State
Living people
Nigerian footballers
Nigeria international footballers
Association football forwards
Warri Wolves F.C. players
Akwa United F.C. players
C.D. Feirense players
Leixões S.C. players
KF Bylis Ballsh players
Nigeria Professional Football League players
Liga Portugal 2 players
Kategoria Superiore players
Nigerian expatriate footballers
Nigerian expatriate sportspeople in Portugal
Expatriate footballers in Portugal
Nigerian expatriate sportspeople in Albania
Expatriate footballers in Albania